Tg-PVR mouse is a transgenic mouse, developed at the Central Institute for Experimental Animals (CIEA), carrying the human poliovirus receptor (PVR) gene, to be used in testing the neurovirulence of oral polio vaccine (OPV). The neurovirulent safety and consistency of OPV had been traditionally assayed in the monkey neurovirulence test (MNVT), as only primates, including humans and monkeys, are susceptible to polioviruses. After the development of the Tg-PVR mouse, the suitability of the mouse to replace monkeys for OPV testing was evaluated and confirmed.

Origin

Characteristics

References

Immunology mice